The World Split Open: How the Modern Women's Movement Changed America (2000, revised edition 2006) is a book by feminist historian Ruth Rosen that reviews the women's rights movement in the United States during the second half of the twentieth century. Rosen discusses the way that the media framed the feminist movement and the reaction in society as women gained more influence.

References

External links
 C-SPAN Video Library The World Split Open

Feminist books
History books about the United States
History of women in the United States
Women's rights in the United States